The 49th ISSF World Shooting Championships were held in Zagreb, Croatia from July 22, 2006, to August 5, 2006.


Medal count

World records 
A total of 15 world records were bettered or equalled during the championships.

Rifle events

Men

Women

Pistol events

Men

Women

Shotgun events

Men

Women

Running target events

Men

Women

See also
Shooting at the 2008 Summer Olympics

References 
 Full results at ISSF TV

External links 
 Official site

ISSF World Shooting Championships
World Shooting Championships
ISSF
2006 in Croatian sport
2000s in Zagreb
Sports competitions in Zagreb
Shooting competitions in Croatia
July 2006 sports events in Europe
August 2006 sports events in Europe